Thadiya is a small village along the Mahendra Highway in eastern Nepal.

References

Populated places in Morang District